Mount Abu Wildlife Sanctuary is located in one of the oldest mountain ranges of India, the Aravalli range. It was declared a wildlife sanctuary in 1980. Te Eco sensitive zone around the sanctuary was notified on 11 Nov 2020

Geography
The rocks are igneous and due to the weathering effect of wind and water, large cavities are common in them. 

The sanctuary is in the Khathiar-Gir dry deciduous forests ecoregion.

Flora
It is very rich in floral bio-diversity starting from xenomorphic sub-tropical thorn forests in the foot hills to sub-tropical evergreen forests along PRIYEN water courses and valleys at higher altitudes. There are about 112 plant families with 449 genera and 820 species. Of these, 663 species are dicots while 157 species are monocots. About 81 species of trees, 89 species of shrubs, 28 species of climbers and 17 species of tuberous plants of medicinal importance have been identified in this sanctuary. The rare and endemic plants reported are  Dicliptera abuensis Blatt, Carvia colloseeys, Ischaemun kingie,Convolvulus blateri and Ceropegia bulbosa. Some of the native plant species  Anogeisus sericea var sericea, Begonia trichocarpa, Crotolaria filipe, Indigofera constricta are listed in Red data book of IUCN 

Mount Abu is the only place in Rajasthan where one can observe a variety of orchids. The place is also rich in bryophytes and algae. Three species of wild roses and 16 species of ferns some of which are quite rare have also been reported from here. The south-west part of the sanctuary is rich in bamboo forests.

Fauna
Among the fauna living in Mount Abu Wildlife Sanctuary are Indian leopard, sloth bear, Sambar deer, wild boar and chinkara. The jungle cat, small Indian civet, Indian wolf, striped hyena, golden jackal, Indian fox, gray langur, Indian pangolin, Indian grey mongoose, Indian hare, Indian crested porcupine and Indian hedgehog have also been recorded. The Asiatic lion was last recorded in 1872, and the Bengal tiger in 1970.

More than 250 species of birds have been recorded including the grey jungle fowl. The rare green avadavat is commonly found here.

See also 
 Arid Forest Research Institute (AFRI)

References

Mount Abu
Khathiar-Gir dry deciduous forests
1960 establishments in Rajasthan
Protected areas established in 1960
Tourism in Mount Abu
Wildlife sanctuaries in Rajasthan